Agapanthia detrita is a species of beetle in the subfamily Lamiinae, found in Kazakhstan and Uzbekistan. The species is 12–22 mm in length, and is black coloured. Adults fly from April to June.

References 

detrita
Beetles described in 1882
Beetles of Asia